Saint Florentius of Strasbourg was the 13th Bishop of Strasbourg 678-693 or +660. His feast day is celebrated 3 April or 7 November (810, Niederhaslach).

See also
 Catholic Church in France
 Collegiate church Saint Florentius

References

Bishops of Strasbourg
Alsatian saints